LOL, whose full original title is LOL: Last One Laughing, is an international comedy format through the Amazon Prime Video platform. It has been adapted in Australia, France, Germany, Italy, Spain, Mexico, India, Brazil, Canada (separate editions in English and French), Sweden, Argentina and Netherlands plus an unlicensed adaptation in Iran. The concept was developed first in Japan, the original show is called "Hitoshi Matsumoto Presents Documental", also a Prime Original and has been aired in nine seasons since 2016.

Rules 
Ten comedians stay in a living-room style studio with hidden cameras for a few hours (usually six). During this time, they must try to make their opponents laugh in any way and by any means, while not reacting at their opponents’ attempts to make them break.

At the first laugh, the competitor is cautioned (yellow carded), while a second eliminates the player from the game (red carded). However, large infractions may be given an automatic red card. Eliminated players join the host in the observation room, but may return as an external challenger to the remaining contestants. The comedians can also be eliminated if they aren't active enough. The only way to communicate with the outside is a telephone controlled by the host.

Versions

Japan 
The Japanese comedy show was developed and is hosted by comedian Hitoshi Matsumoto and was first released in 2016. By now nine seasons have been released and the format has been adapted into the international format LOL. Most rules are completely identical to those in the adapted shows.

Mexico 
The Mexican edition is titled LOL: Last One Laughing, and it is hosted by Eugenio Derbez. The first season, consisting of six episodes, was released in 2018, while the second, also of six episodes, in 2019. The third season of 6 episodes premiered in December 2021. The fourth season of 6 episodes , premiered in 2022;  in this season the participants were teams of two comedians.

Australia 
The Australian edition, distributed under the title LOL: Australia, was hosted by Rebel Wilson: the first season was released in 2020. Competitors were Sam Simmons, Nick Cody, Frank Woodley, Anne Edmonds, Becky Lucas, Dilruk Jayasinha, Susie Youssef, Nazeem Hussain, Ed Kavalee and Joel Creasey.

Italy 

The Italian edition is entitled LOL - Chi ride è fuori and is hosted by singer Fedez and TV personality Mara Maionchi. The first season consists of a total of six episodes, of which the first four were made available on April 1, 2021, while the remaining two were released on April 8, 2021. The second season is hosted by Fedez and TV personality Frank Matano, himself a former contestant in season 1. The second  season consists of a total of six episodes too, of which the first four were made available on February 24, 2022, while the remaining two on March 3, 2022.

Iran

The Iranian unlicensed version is titled Joker and hosted by Siamak Ansari. The first season was released in November 2021 and the second season aired in December 2021.

Germany 
The German edition is entitled LOL: Last One Laughing and is conducted by actor and comedian Michael "Bully" Herbig. The first season consists of a total of six episodes, of which the first four were made available on April 8, 2021, while the remaining two were released on April 15, 2021.
 There is a second season started in October, 2021.
The first two episodes of its third season were made available on 14 April 2022 on Amazon Prime. The third season is dedicated to late contestant Mirco Nontschew who passed in December 2021.

Spain 
The Spanish edition is called LOL: Si te ríes, pierdes. The first season was conducted by Santiago Segura. The first 5 episodes were released on May 14, 2021, with a 6th episode being released one week later. The second season, hosted by Silvia Abril and Carolina Iglesias, was released on May 20, 2022.

France 
The French edition called LOL: Qui rit, sort! started in 2021 and spawned three seasons.

India 
The Hindi-language edition of the format is titled LOL: Hasse Toh Phasse. Hosted by Bollywood actors Boman Irani and Arshad Warsi, the show premiered on Amazon Prime on 29 April 2021. Participants include notable TV and stand-up comedians like Mallika Dua, Aakash Gupta (winner of Comicstaan Season 2), and Aditi Mittal.

The Tamil-language version, LOL: Enga Siri Paapom, hosted by legendary Tamil comedian/actor Vivek (posthumously) and Mirchi Siva, released on 27 August 2021.  Participants include Pugazh, Abishek Kumar, Sathish, Aarthi, Premgi Amaren, Powerstar Srinivasan, R.J. Vigneshkanth, Maya Sundarakrishnan, Bhargav Ramakrishnan and Syama Harini. 
Winners of this season were Pugazh and Abhishek, who split the winning amount (INR 25 lakh).

Brazil 
The Brazilian edition is entitled LOL: Se Rir, Já Era and is hosted by the comedians Tom Cavalcante and Clarice Falcão. 

Due to the COVID-19 pandemic in Brazil, the first season was entirely shot in Uruguay. The first 3 episodes of the series were released on December 3, 2021.

Canada
The English Canadian edition launched February 18, 2022 with two episodes weekly until March 4, 2022, with host Jay Baruchel. Competing comedians are Tom Green, Andrew Phung, Colin Mochrie, Dave Foley, Mae Martin, Caroline Rhea, Brandon Ash-Mohammed, Debra DiGiovanni, Jon Lajoie and K. Trevor Wilson.

Amazon has also greenlit a French version for Quebec audiences. Hosted by Patrick Huard, the series premiered in January 2023 with participating comedians Marie-Lyne Joncas, Rachid Badouri, Yves P. Pelletier, Arnaud Soly, Christine Morency, Laurent Paquin, Richardson Zéphir, Virginie Fortin, Mathieu Dufour and Édith Cochrane.

Albania

The Albanian edition is entitled Qesh Mirë... Kush Qesh i Fundit and is hosted by Salsano Rrapi and Xhemi Shehu and is broadcast on Top Channel. The first season, began airing on March 8, 2022, which consists of a total of eight episodes. All episodes are broadcast every Tuesday.

Dutch
The Dutch version is entitled LOL Last one Laughing Nederland and is hosted by two Belgian comedians Philippe Geubels and Jeroom Snelders and was broadcast on Prime Video. The first season began airing on January 20, 2023, which consists of a total of 6 episodes.
The first guests playing this game were: Tineke Schouten, Ruben van der Meer, Alex Ploeg, Roué Verveer, Rayen Panday, Henry van Loon, Soundos El Ahmadi, Gover Meit, Nienke Plas and Bas Hoeflaak.

References 

Amazon (company)
Comedy television series